Sammy Ofer (born Shmuel Herskovich; 22 February 1922 – 3 June 2011) was an Israeli shipping magnate and one of the richest men in the country.

Early life
Shmuel Herskovich was born in 1922 in Galați, Romania, to a Jewish family. In 1924, his family immigrated to the then British Mandate of Palestine (present-day Israel). The family resided in the city of Haifa. With the start of World War II, he enlisted in the British Royal Navy. During the 1948 Arab-Israeli War, he served in the Israeli Sea Corps.

Career
After finishing his military service, he became a shipping agent with the Eastern Conglomerate, and by 1950 had bought his first ship. He expanded in the shipping business.

Ofer's assets were partly in his exclusive ownership and partly owned together with his brother Yuli, consisting of one of the largest private shipping companies in the world, with a value of $3.6 billion in 2011. This includes the companies ZIM, Royal Caribbean International, Israel Corporation, Israel Chemicals, Oil Refineries Ltd, Bank Mizrahi-Tfahot, and Tower Semiconductor.

The annual Forbes magazine's list of The World's Billionaires estimated in 2011 his fortune, together with his brother Yuli's, to be $10.3 billion, ranked him in 2011 as the 79th in the wealthiest people in the world, and the wealthiest man in Israel.

Philanthropy
In March 2008, Ofer donated £20 million to London's National Maritime Museum (NMM) at Greenwich, as part of a £35 million programme of expansion. 
Ofer donated £3.3 million to help complete the restoration of the Cutty Sark by 2010.

In 2013, a £1.5 million donation from Eyal Ofer enabled the NMM to buy two paintings by George Stubbs from 1772. The paintings depict a kangaroo and a dingo, and are the first depictions of Australian animals in Western art.

In 2007, Sammy Ofer donated $25 million to the Rambam Health Care Campus in Haifa, Israel. This contribution was earmarked for two main purposes: $17 million for the 2000-bed fortified underground hospital and $7 million to renovate the existing departments of Surgery, Urology, and ENT.

On 10 November 2008 he was made an Honorary Knight Commander of the Order of the British Empire (KBE) in recognition of his involvement with maritime heritage in the United Kingdom.

Personal life
He was married to Aviva Ofer. They had two sons: Idan Ofer and Eyal Ofer. They mainly resided in Monte Carlo, Monaco.

Death
On 3 June 2011, Ofer died in his house in Tel Aviv, Israel, at the age of 89.

Legacy
In 2013, Idan Ofer donated £25 million to London Business School in honor of his father, Sammy. A new educational facility at Marylebone Town Hall was established as the Sammy Ofer Centre. The gift was the largest in the school's history. There is also a well-known Israeli soccer stadium named after him that he also partially funded, Sammy Ofer Stadium in the city Haifa, Israel.

References

1922 births
2011 deaths
Israeli businesspeople in shipping
Honorary Knights Commander of the Order of the British Empire
Israeli billionaires
Israeli chief executives
Israeli Ashkenazi Jews
Royal Navy personnel of World War II
Israeli people of the 1948 Arab–Israeli War
Israeli philanthropists
Ashkenazi Jews in Mandatory Palestine
Jewish military personnel
Jewish philanthropists
Naturalized citizens of Israel
People from Galați
People from Tel Aviv
Romanian emigrants to Mandatory Palestine
Sammy
Burials at Trumpeldor Cemetery
20th-century philanthropists
Romanian Ashkenazi Jews
Israeli people of Romanian-Jewish descent
Romanian emigrants to Israel